Dannevirke is a town in the Tararua District, North island of New Zealand. 

Dannevirke may also refer to:

Dannevirke, Nebraska, a community in the United States
Danevirke, a system of Danish fortifications in Schleswig-Holstein
Dannewerk, a municipality in Amt Haddeby in Schleswig-Flensburg District, Germany